Connor Stephen Malcom Jones (born 30 November 1998) is an English professional footballer who plays as a midfielder.

Early and personal life
Jones' father died in January 2018; the police investigated it as murder.

Career
Jones began his career at Bristol Rovers, spending time on loan at Yate Town during the 2016–17 season. He moved on loan to Mangotsfield United in November 2017, making 23 league appearances. He returned to Mangotsfield United for a second loan spell in March 2018, making a further 3 league appearances. He made his senior debut for Bristol Rovers on 13 November 2018 in the EFL Trophy, one of four Bristol Rovers players (alongside Tareiq Holmes-Dennis, Zain Walker and Theo Widdrington) to do so in that match.

He was released by Bristol Rovers at the end of the 2018–19 season.

References

1998 births
Living people
English footballers
Bristol Rovers F.C. players
Yate Town F.C. players
Mangotsfield United F.C. players
Southern Football League players
Association football midfielders